Michigan's 19th congressional district is an obsolete United States congressional district in Michigan.  The first candidate elected from the newly created district was Billie S. Farnum in 1964. It was eliminated as a result of the redistricting cycle after the 1980 Census.

The last Representative from the district, William Broomfield, was subsequently elected from the 18th district after dissolution of this district.

List of members representing the district

References

 The Political graveyard: U.S. Representatives from Michigan, 1807-2003
 U.S. Representatives 1837-2003, Michigan Manual 2003-2004

 Congressional Biographical Directory of the United States 1774–present

19
Former congressional districts of the United States
Constituencies established in 1965
1965 establishments in Michigan
Constituencies disestablished in 1983
1983 disestablishments in Michigan